How to Walk Away is the eighth solo album by singer/songwriter Juliana Hatfield. It was released in North America on August 19, 2008. On September 29, 2008, it was followed by her memoir, When I Grow Up. The iTunes version of the album features a bonus track, "Not Enough" – 4:02 (offered in DRM-free iTunes Plus format).

Track listing

Personnel
Juliana Hatfield – vocals, guitar, keyboards
Andy Chase –  guitar, keyboards, string arrangements, backing vocals
Jody Porter – guitar
Peter Adams – piano
Jason Hatfield – piano
Tracy Bonham – violin
Jeff Alan Hill – bass guitar, cello
Ethan Eubanks – drums
Rudyard Lee Cullers – backing vocals
Richard Butler – vocals on "This Lonely Love"
Matthew Caws – vocals on "Such a Beautiful Girl"

Production
Producer: Andy Chase
Engineer: Rudyard Lee Cullers
Mixing: Andy Chase and David Kahne
Mastering: Scott Hull
Design and Layout: Jordyn Bonds

References

2008 albums
Juliana Hatfield albums